Despite the advent of electric and diesel locomotives in the mid-20th century, steam locomotives continued to be used and constructed into the 21st century. The use of steam locomotives in regular non-tourist revenue service concluded in 2022.

Steam locomotives constructed in the 21st century fall into two broad categories: those that use advanced steam technology to be commercially competitive with diesels; and those built to more traditional designs for hauling tourist trains. Even locomotives in the second case likely use some modern methods and materials.  These include welded boilers, to simplify construction, and roller bearings to improve reliability.  For safety reasons, asbestos is not used for boiler lagging and is replaced by other materials, such as glass fibre. If the locomotive runs on main lines, safety systems such as the Train Protection & Warning System (TPWS) and an On-Train Monitoring Recorder (OTMR) must be fitted.

Revenue operations 
JS-class steam locomotives were used in active service at a rural coal mine in western China until 2022. Railfan & Railroad stated in 2022 that "the only places on earth to see steam locomotives in revenue freight service are small switching operations in China, North Korea and Bosnia," but that these were "sporadic at best."

Advanced steam construction 

A leading proponent of advanced steam technology is the Swiss company DLM AG.

 5AT Advanced Technology Steam Locomotive. This project was officially cancelled in March 2012 due to lack of support.

Traditional steam construction

Built

Denmark
 SJS Odin Class 2-2-2 "Odin" replica, built between 2004 and 2018.

Germany 

 99. 2324-4, a replica of the DRG Class 99.32 built in 2008/09, in scheduled passenger service on the Molli railway.

India 
 Nilgiri Mountain Railway X class 4 built between 2011 and 2014, 2 built in 2021. 5 were oil fired, one loco 37400 was designed to be coal fired.
 Darjeeling Himalayan Railway B Class 2 built in 2004.

Switzerland
 BRB H2/3 Class 6 built between 1992 and 1995, 1x for the BRB as H2/3, 1x for MTGN and 4x for the Austrian State Railways (ÖBB).

United Kingdom
 GWR 2900 Saint 4-6-0 2999 Lady of Legend, built from 2009 to 2019. Completed 5 April 2019. The locomotive is a conversion from GWR 4900 4-6-0 4942 Maindy Hall.
 LNER Peppercorn Class A1 4-6-2 60163 Tornado, built from 1994 to 2008. Completed 1 August 2008.
 GWR Firefly Class 2-2-2 replica, built 2005. Currently on static display.
 GWR steam railmotor No. 93. Restored from 1998 to 2012. It ran with Auto Trailer No. 92 for the first time in 2013.
 Lyd. A 2-6-2T, built from 1999 to 2010 by the Ffestiniog Railway. First steamed on 2 May 2010, it ran its first passenger train on 11 September the same year. Despite being somewhat of a replica of Lew (and based on the design of the latter), it was named Lyd. However, since the 2019 Autumn gala of the L&BR, it was renamed to Lew.
Lyn. A 2-4-2T, built from 2009 to 2017 by the 762 Club. First steamed on 8 July 2017.
Corris Railway No. 7 0-4-2ST, completed in 2005 for the revived Corris Railway by Winson Engineering and Drayton Designs, based on the original No. 4, a Kerr Stuart "Tattoo."

United States
 Steam into History 4-4-0 No. 17 "York". Completed in 2013 by the Kloke Locomotive Works. Although not based on a specific locomotive aside from the looks of American steam locomotives in the 19th century, it is still considered a newbuilt. It runs on oil instead of wood.

Under construction

Australia
 South Australian Railways Z class 4-4-0 Z199
 Victorian Railways V class 2-8-0 V499

Ireland
NCC Class W 2-6-0 no 105.

United Kingdom
 BR Standard Class 2 2-6-2T 84030 project - tank conversion of 2-6-0 78059.
 BR Standard Class 3 2-6-2T 82045 project.
 BR Standard Class 6 4-6-2 72010 Hengist project. Newbuild member of class of the original unbuilt class-members of the second batch for the Southern region.
 GCR Class 2 (LNER Class D7) 4-4-0 567 project.
 GER Class H88 (LNER Class D16/2) 4-4-0 8783 Phoenix project.
 GER Class M15 (LNER Class F5) 2-4-2T 67218 project.
 GWR 1000 County 4-6-0 1014 County of Glamorgan. Replica of an original engine that was scrapped in 1964.
 GWR 3800 County 4-4-0 3840 County of Montgomery.
 GWR 4700 Class 2-8-0 4709 project.
 GWR 6800 Grange 4-6-0 6880 Betton Grange project.
 LB&SCR H2 class 4-4-2 project. This project however is a replica of the fourth Atlantic 32424 Beachy Head and will incorporate some parts from the original locomotive.
 LMS Patriot Class 4-6-0 5551 The Unknown Warrior. Replica of the original engine (which was never given a name throughout its working career) which was scrapped in 1962.
 LNER Class B17 4-6-0 61673 Spirit of Sandringham project.
 LNER Class P2 2-8-2 2001 Cock O' the North project. Replica of original engine in streamlined condition.
 LNER Class P2 2-8-2 2007 Prince of Wales project. New build member of class in original unstreamlined condition.
 LNER Class V4 2-6-2 3403 Highlander. Construction of the locomotive will begin in 2022. Drawings for the engine have been acquired and construction is expected to begin following the completion of Prince of Wales. Parts for the engine have already been acquired which include tyres for the engines pony, cartazzi and 5 ft 8in driving wheels. A chimney has also been acquired alongside two speedometer drive generators.
 LNWR George the Fifth Class 4-4-0 2013 Prince George project.
 NER Class K 0-4-0T replica of original class member No.559. 
 NER Class O (LNER Class G5) 0-4-4T replica of original class member No. 1759 project.
 Ffestiniog Railway Double Fairlie 0-4-4-0T No. 8 James Spooner. A replica of the original locomotive being built to replace Earl of Merioneth.
Ffestiniog Railway George England 0-4-0T+T No. 3 Mountaineer. A replica of the original locomotive built in 1863 and scrapped in 1879(?). It will be named Mountaineer III, since another side tank locomotive (built for the WD in 1916) re-used the name.
 Catch Me Who Can 2-2-0 replica. Richard Trevithick locomotive of 1808. (Able to turn wheels under steam when set on blocks, but not yet ready to run on rails since braking system not fitted, yet)
 LNWR Bloomer Class 2-2-2 670 replica. Construction began in 1986; it was 90% complete by 1990 but has never been finished. Work recommenced in 2017, but another project to finish the locomotive was launched on June 24, 2019.
 Corris Railway Hughes Falcon Works 0-4-2ST, No. 10, by Alan Keef Ltd. based on the original Nos. 1, 2, and 3. Passed its steam test on September 21, 2022 and made its first public appearance three days later with the goal of operational service by the start of the 2023 passenger season.

United States
 PRR T1 4-4-4-4 duplex No. 5550: The Pennsylvania Railroad built 52 4-4-4-4 duplex locomotives for passenger service, and the last one was scrapped in 1956. The Pennsylvania Railroad T1 Steam Locomotive Trust was created to construct a fully functional 53rd member of the T1 class. The new T1, to be numbered 5550, is expected to be completed by the year 2030. The project cast the first major component - a Boxpok driver - in February 2016, and a second driver followed in March 2017. Since then, they have completed constructing the cab, prow, and have even acquired the last PRR long haul tender for use with the 5550.
 Rio Grande Southern Railroad No. 36: a replica of the original RGS Baldwin 8-18-C class 4-4-0 is being built for the Ridgway Railroad Museum.
 WW&F No. 11: The Wiscasset, Waterville, and Farmington Railway Museum is constructing No. 11, which is meant to be a replica of the original WW&F's No. 7. No. 7 was a Baldwin 28-ton 2-4-4T Forney locomotive (Baldwin classification 10-16 1/4 C-5a) which was scrapped in 1937 along with the rest of the railroad, being badly damaged in the 1931 Wiscasset roundhouse fire. The new locomotive is being constructed traditional techniques and tools, such as a riveted boiler. The project has been underway since 2007. Completed components include the bell and builder's plate, as well as wheel center castings and drive pins. No scheduled completion date is set.
V&T Lyon, 2-6-0, replica of original engine.

Proposed

United Kingdom
 LMS Fowler 2-6-4T no 42424. Work on this locomotive will begin after the completion of 5551 The Unknown Warrior.
 LNER Class K3 2-6-0. Planned to be built after the V3 & V4 are completed.
 LNER Class V3 2-6-2T. Planned to be built following completion of the V4.
 SECR E Class 4-4-0 no 516. Planned to be built after the completion of 32424 Beachy Head replica.
Highland Railway Ben Class 4-4-0 no 54398 Ben Alder. Replica of original engine that was hoped to be preserved.
Ffestiniog Railway Single Fairlie 0-6-4T Gowrie.

Cancelled

United Kingdom 

 GNR Class J23 (LNER Class J50) 0-6-0T 8905 project. This projected was cancelled in February 2019 due to "circumstances beyond control". All the funds raised were donated to the LNER Class P2 2-8-2 2007 Prince of Wales project.
 GWR 2221 County Class 4-4-2T.
 LMS Caprotti Black 5 4-6-0.
 L&YR Hughes Dreadnought Class 4-6-0.
 LNWR Claughton Class 4-6-0 6004 Princess Louise project.
LNER Class B17 4-6-0 61662 Manchester United project (replica of original engine) – parts sent on to Spirit of Sandringham project.
GWR 4000 Class.

References